This is a list of international trips made by presidents of Iran.

President Ebrahim Raisi

President Hassan Rouhani

President Mahmoud Ahmadinejad

President Mohammad Khatami

President Akbar Hashemi Rafsanjani

President Ali Khamenei

See also
 List of state visits made by kings of Iran
 Foreign relations of Iran

References

External links

Foreign relations of Iran
Iran history-related lists
Iran diplomacy-related lists
Diplomatic visits by heads of government
Lists of diplomatic visits by heads of state